The Moose Jaw Maroons were a minor-league ice hockey team in the Prairie Hockey League.  Based in Moose Jaw, Saskatchewan, Canada, they existed from 1926–28.  In 1926–27, the team was known as the Moose Jaw Warriors before changing its name to the Maroons.

Moose Jaw had previously spent half a season as a member of the PrHL's predecessor, the Western Canada Hockey League in 1922 after the Saskatoon Sheiks moved mid-season to the southern Saskatchewan city.  The Sheiks would return to Saskatoon for the next season.

The Maroons were disbanded when the PrHL ceased operations after the 1927–28 season.

Season-by-season record
Note: W = Wins, L = Losses, T = Ties, GF= Goals For, GA = Goals Against, Pts = Points

See also
List of PrHL seasons
List of ice hockey teams in Saskatchewan

References
1926-27 season standings @ hockeydb.com
1928-28 season standings @ hockeydb.com

Defunct ice hockey teams in Canada
Defunct sports teams in Saskatchewan
Ice hockey teams in Saskatchewan
Ice hockey clubs established in 1926
Sport in Moose Jaw